Bella Morte is a gothic rock band that was formed in 1996 in Charlottesville, Virginia, United States. They incorporate elements of metal, dark wave, deathrock, alternative and synthpop. The band's name means "beautiful death" in Italian. According to Andy Deane, the name was chosen to "suggest that beauty can be found in tragedy", which is a theme occurring in every Bella Morte album.

As of 2015, they are signed to Metropolis Records. Bella Morte previously released albums through their own label, Some Wear Leather, and through Cleopatra Records. In early fall 2006, Metropolis Records announced that Bella Morte had reached number one on the company's pre-order sales list with their new album, Bleed the Grey Sky Black, which was released on October 10, 2006.

The bass guitarist and co-founder Gopal Metro decided to leave the band, playing his last show on March 10, 2007, in Charlottesville. At the same show, the vocalist Andy Deane announced that Tony Pugh would replace Metro. At the beginning of summer 2008 it was announced that Jordan Marchini would not be touring with the band any longer. He returned in 2011.

Current Band Members 
Andy Deane – vocals
Tony Lechmanski – guitars
Marshall Camden – bass

Former Band Members 
Gopal Metro – bass
Tony Pugh – bass
Jordan Marchini – drums
Branden Shores – drums
Scotty Derrico – drums
Clay Caricofe – drums
Chris "Frizzle" – guitars
Bn Whitlow – guitars
Micah Consylman – keyboards (mainly the keytar during live performance)
James Warnock – keyboards, lighting

Discography

Full releases 
 Remorse (cassette only, demo) (1996)
 Remains (1997)
 Where Shadows Lie (2000)
 The Death Rock EP (Vinyl – limited to 300) (2001)
 The Quiet (2002)
 The Death Rock EP (CD w/ bonus tracks) (2002)
 Remains (Remastered Version) (2002)
 As the Reasons Die (2004)
 Songs for the Dead (2004)
 Bleed The Grey Sky Black (2006)
 Beautiful Death (October 7, 2008)
 Before the Flood (June 14, 2011)
 Rare and Unreleased, volume 1 (February 14, 2012)
 The Best of Bella Morte 1996–2012 (June 25, 2013)
 Exorcisms (2014)
 Year of the Ghost (August 14, 2017)

Side projects 
Andy Deane released a solo album as "The Rain Within", a reference to the Bella Morte song "The Rain Within Her Hands", in 2010 titled Pain Management.

Compilations 
 The Pink and The Black (1998) (Delinquent Records) – "One Winter's Night"
 The Unquiet Grave Vol 1 (1998) (Cleopatra Records) – "Funeral Night"
 Music from the Succubus Club (2000) (Dancing Ferret Discs) – "Fall No More"
 The Darkest Millennium (2000) (Cleopatra Records) – "The Rain Within Her Hands"
 A Gothic-Industrial Tribute to Smashing Pumpkins (2001) (Cleopatra Records) – "Soma"
 New Dark Noise (2002) (Cleopatra Records) – "Relics"
 Electronic Saviors Volume 2: Recurrence (2012) (Metropolis Records) – "Lost"
 Electronic Saviors Volume 3: Remission (2014) (Metropolis Records) – "The One Beside Me"

Music videos 
"In The Dirt" directed by Lloyd Kaufman was filmed on February 20, 2010, at Con Nooga in Chattanooga, Tennessee
 "Find Forever Gone" directed by Eric Thomas Craven. Released on September 30, 2008
 "On the Edge" directed by Eric Thomas Craven. Released on February 14, 2008
"Earth Angel" directed by Eric Thomas Craven. Released on February 14, 2007
"Another Way" directed by Wendy Shuey (2004)
"Exorcisms" directed by Marshall Camden (2014)
"Water Through Sand" directed by Brian Wimer (2015)

References

External links 

Bella Morte band at Metropolis Records official website

American dark wave musical groups
American gothic rock groups
American industrial music groups
American death rock groups
Punk rock groups from Virginia
American synth-pop groups
Musical groups established in 1996
Metropolis Records artists
1996 establishments in Virginia